Sick building can refer to:

Sick building syndrome
Sick Building, a 2007 Dr. Who novel